is a dungeon crawler role-playing video game developed by Sting Entertainment. It is the sequel to To Heart 2: Dungeon Travelers within the To Heart 2 franchise. Dungeon Travelers 2 was released on March 28, 2013, on the PlayStation Portable in Japan; an enhanced remake for the PlayStation Vita was released in Japan on September 25, 2014, and later in North America and Europe in 2015.

A sequel game for the PlayStation Vita titled Dungeon Travelers 2-2 was released in 2017 in Japan.

Gameplay
The player takes on the role of an adventurer who is tasked with forming a party, navigating through dungeons, gathering treasure, and engaging in combat against monsters. Characters can be improved through learning skills and equipping items. The battle system is turn-based, and dungeon navigation takes place from a first-person perspective on a grid map. Party members can belong to five main classes (namely fighters, magic users, scouts, maids and spielers) which branch into over 30 different subclasses with unique skill sets and outfits as characters progress in specialisation. For instance, a fighter can develop into a paladin and a valkyrie, while magic users can transition into enchantresses and witches.

Setting
Monsters have been appearing throughout the Kingdom of Romulea, and have become a threat to humanity. In order to subdue the monsters, an alchemist devised a magic seal able to constrain them. Fried Einhard, an adventurer dispatched by the Royal Library, discovers a damaged shrine on his journey to stop the monster uprising.

Development

The original PlayStation Portable game was released in March 2013 by Aquaplus, as part of a long line of games and media derived from the erotic visual novel To Heart and its sequel, To Heart 2. Later in June 2014, the PlayStation Vita version was released, which included additional characters, redesigned dungeons, improved user interface, and improved quality illustrations.

The western localisation by Atlus features Japanese voices with English subtitles, and is compatible with the PlayStation TV. In order to ensure that the game remains acceptable for a western audience and meets a "Mature" ESRB rating, Atlus censored a total of four CG images within the game which were deemed to be overtly sexual in nature.

Reception

The game has a score of 76 on Metacritic.

PlayStation Nation gave the game a review score of 8/10, stating that the game is an accommodating and gentle introduction to the dungeon crawler genre for newcomers. Meanwhile, Gaming Age scored the game B+, noting that while not all players will be able to accept the game's sexual fanservice, it provides an adequate level of challenge and that the RPG mechanics are well detailed and enjoyable.

Gamecritics.com suggests that although the overall storyline is not particularly interesting, the character dialogue is engaging and that the artwork is well done. PlayStation Lifestyle rates the game 7.5 out of 10, praising the game's variety in terms of character upgrades, while similarly finding the story lacklustre. Capsule Computers and BioGamer Girl both gave an 8/10 rating, referring to the game as a satisfying dungeon crawling game with solid mechanics.

Sales
When it released in Japan on the PSP, 32,000 copies of Dungeon Travelers 2 were sold, with 39,000 sold after two weeks, while the PS Vita version sold 16,000 copies in its launch week and 20,000 total after its second week.

Notes

References

External links 

 

2013 video games
2014 video games
Sting Entertainment games
Atlus games
Nippon Ichi Software games
Role-playing video games
First-person party-based dungeon crawler video games
PlayStation Vita games
PlayStation Portable games
ToHeart
Video games developed in Japan
Single-player video games
Aquaplus games